Potoci may refer to:

 Bosnia and Herzegovina
 Potoci, Drvar
 Potoci, Istočni Drvar
 Potoci, Mostar

Montenegro
 Potoci, Pljevlja

Romania
 Potoci, a village in Bicaz, Romania

See also 

  Potok (disambiguation)
Potoc, a village in the commune Sasca Montană, Romania
 Potoc, a river in Arad County, Romania